Operation Just Cause is a 2019 Panamanian action war historical drama film directed by Luis Franco Brantley and Luis Pacheco. Produced by executive producers Janet Alvarez Gonzalez and Jacobo Silvera. It was selected as the Panamanian entry for the Best International Feature Film at the 93rd Academy Awards, but it was not nominated.

Plot
In El Chorrillo, a military officer, a fisherman, an American businessman, a prostitute and a young man trying to keep his friends from joining the fighting live through the United States invasion of Panama.

Cast
 Arian Abadi as Calixto
 Anthony Anel as Ismael
 Patricia de Leon as Carmina
 Aaron Zebede as Mayor Robledo
 Janet Alvarez Gonzalez as Colonel Alvarez
 Joavany Alvarez as Lieutenant Colonel Silvera Southcom

See also
 List of submissions to the 93rd Academy Awards for Best International Feature Film
 List of Panamanian submissions for the Academy Award for Best International Feature Film

References

External links
 

2019 films
Panamanian drama films
2010s Spanish-language films
2010s historical drama films
2019 action drama films